Ahern Glacier  is a small tributary glacier flowing east from the Churchill Mountains between Mount Lindley and Mount Hoskins to enter Starshot Glacier. It was named by the Holyoake, Cobham, and Queen Elizabeth Ranges Party of the New Zealand Geological Survey Antarctic Expedition (1964–65) for B. Ahern, a member of the party.

See also
 List of glaciers in the Antarctic

References

Glaciers of Oates Land